Vasilyevka is a rural locality (a selo) and the administrative center of Vasilyevskoye Rural Settlement, Gribanovsky District, Voronezh Oblast, Russia. The population was 580 as of 2010. There are 16 streets.

Geography 
Vasilyevka is located 31 km southwest of Gribanovsky (the district's administrative centre) by road. Nizhny Karachan is the nearest rural locality.

References 

Rural localities in Gribanovsky District